Brantley County is a county located in the southeastern part of the U.S. state of Georgia. As of the 2020 census, the population was 18,021. The county seat is Nahunta.
Brantley County is part of the Brunswick, Georgia Metropolitan Statistical Area.

History 
Georgia voters passed a state constitutional amendment on November 2, 1920, to form Brantley County from pieces of Charlton, Pierce, and Wayne counties. Although the precise origin of the county name is unknown, it is believed that it honors U.S. congressman William Gordon Brantley.

Geography 
The Satilla River runs through Brantley County.

The bulk of Brantley County, from east of Hortense south to west of Waynesville and west to east of Waycross, is located in the Satilla River sub-basin of the St. Marys-Satilla basin. The county's eastern border area, east of Waynesville, is located in the Cumberland-St. Simons sub-basin of the St. Marys-Satilla River basin. A small northwestern corner, west of Hortense, is located in the Little Satilla sub-basin of the larger St. Marys-Satilla River basin, and a very small southwestern corner of Brantley County is located in the Upper Suwannee River sub-basin of the larger Suwannee River basin.

Major highways 

  U.S. Route 82
  U.S. Route 301
  State Route 15
  State Route 23
  State Route 32
  State Route 110
  State Route 121
  State Route 520

Adjacent counties
 Wayne County - northeast
 Glynn County - east
 Camden County - southeast
 Charlton County - southwest
 Ware County - west
 Pierce County - northwest

Demographics

2000 census
As of the census of 2000, there were 14,629 people, 5,436 households, and 4,153 families living in the county. There were 6,490 housing units at an average density of 15 per square mile (6/km2). The racial makeup of the county was 94.36% White, 3.98% Black or African American, 0.14% Native American, 0.09% Asian, 0.01% Pacific Islander, 0.35% from other races, and 1.08% from two or more races. 1.04% of the population were Hispanic or Latino of any race.

There were 5,436 households, out of which 38.20% had children under the age of 18 living with them, 60.90% were married couples living together, 10.60% had a female householder with no husband present, and 23.60% were non-families. 20.40% of all households were made up of individuals, and 7.70% had someone living alone who was 65 years of age or older. The average household size was 2.68 and the average family size was 3.06.

In the county, the population was spread out, with 28.30% under the age of 18, 8.50% from 18 to 24, 29.90% from 25 to 44, 23.20% from 45 to 64, and 10.10% who were 65 years of age or older. The median age was 35 years. For every 100 females, there were 100.80 males. For every 100 females age 18 and over, there were 98.10 males.

The median income for a household in the county was $30,361, and the median income for a family was $35,534. Males had a median income of $29,269 versus $20,709 for females. The per capita income for the county was $13,713. About 12.10% of families and 15.60% of the population were below the poverty line, including 19.70% of those under age 18 and 16.90% of those age 65 or over.

2010 census
As of the 2010 United States Census, there were 18,411 people, 6,885 households, and 5,075 families living in the county. The racial makeup of the county was 94.4% white, 2.9% black or African American, 0.3% American Indian, 0.2% Asian, 0.7% from other races, and 1.5% from two or more races. Those of Hispanic or Latino origin made up 1.9% of the population. In terms of ancestry, 25.6% were English, 15.1% were Irish, 12.7% were American, and 8.9% were German.

Of the 6,885 households, 38.2% had children under the age of 18 living with them, 54.6% were married couples living together, 13.2% had a female householder with no husband present, 26.3% were non-families, and 22.1% of all households were made up of individuals. The average household size was 2.66 and the average family size was 3.08. The median age was 37.8 years.

The median income for a household in the county was $37,343 and the median income for a family was $43,028. Males had a median income of $39,260 versus $28,154 for females. The per capita income for the county was $18,905. About 18.2% of families and 21.4% of the population were below the poverty line, including 28.6% of those under age 18 and 10.7% of those age 65 or over.

2020 census

As of the 2020 United States census, there were 18,021 people, 6,823 households, and 4,578 families residing in the county.

Education

Politics

Communities

Cities
 Hoboken
 Nahunta

Census-designated place
 Hickox
 Hortense
 Waynesville

Unincorporated community
 Fort Mudge
 Schlatterville

See also

 National Register of Historic Places listings in Brantley County, Georgia
List of counties in Georgia

References
 GeorgiaInfo Brantley County Courthouse History
 GeorgiaInfo record of the Brantley County State Historical Marker

Notes

External links
 Brantley County historical marker

 
1920 establishments in Georgia (U.S. state)
Populated places established in 1920
Georgia (U.S. state) counties
Brunswick metropolitan area